Hung Wen-tung (22 December 1937 – 4 November 2018) was a Taiwanese politician who served on the Legislative Yuan between 1984 and 1990.

He was the second son of business magnate . Hung Wen-tung graduated from Kaohsiung Medical College, and was trained as an orthopedist. He and his first wife had three daughters and one son. Hung married opera performer Yang Li-hua in 1983. After stepping down from the Legislative Yuan, Hung led the Zoological Society of Taipei as chairman. He died of a heart attack at the age of 80 on 4 November 2018.

References

1937 births
2018 deaths
Taipei Members of the Legislative Yuan
Kuomintang Members of the Legislative Yuan in Taiwan
Members of the 1st Legislative Yuan in Taiwan
Taiwanese orthopaedic surgeons
Kaohsiung Medical University alumni
20th-century surgeons